Brian O'Meara may refer to:

 Brian O'Meara (rugby union) (born 1976), Irish rugby union footballer
 Brian O'Meara (hurler) (born 1990), Irish hurler
 Brian O'Meara (Mullinahone hurler) (born 1973), Irish hurler for the Tipperary senior team